Army of Occupation may refer to:

 Army of Occupation (Mexico), the U.S. Army commanded by Zachary Taylor during the Mexican–American War
 Army of Occupation (Germany), formed twice by the British Army of the Rhine following World Wars I and II respectively

See also
 Military occupation
 List of military occupations